Seeleyosaurus is an extinct genus of plesiosaur that was initially placed within the genus Plesiosaurus in 1895 and was given its own genus in 1940. Two species were known: the type, S. guilelmiimperatoris, and the now obsolete species S. holzmadensis, which has since been absorbed into S. guilelmiimperatoris. The holotype was MB.R.1992, a large almost complete skeleton from the Upper Lias (Toarcian) Lias Group Formations of Württemberg, Germany. There seems to be the impression of a rhomboidal flap of skin in a vertical plane; if so, many plesiosaurs may have been equipped in this way. The holotype was destroyed in 1945 (WWII) and only a cast exists today. A second specimen (SMNS 12039), preserved in 3D, has survived until today. It was once the holotype of the now obsolete species S. holzmadensis.

Classification
The following cladogram follows an analysis by Ketchum & Benson, 2011.

Gallery

See also

 List of plesiosaur genera
 Timeline of plesiosaur research

References

Early Jurassic plesiosaurs of Europe
Plesiosauroids
Sauropterygian genera
Fossil taxa described in 1940
Toarcian first appearances